Iotaphora admirabilis is a species of moth of the family Geometridae first described by Charles Oberthür in 1884. It is found in south-eastern Siberia, Korea and Taiwan.

References

Moths described in 1884
Geometrinae